Akaba is a small town in central Togo.

Transport 

It is served by a station on the Togo Railway network.

See also 

 Railway stations in Togo

References 

Populated places in Plateaux Region, Togo